Attorney General Turner may refer to:

Edward C. Turner (1872–1950), Attorney General of Ohio
Richard C. Turner (1927–1986), Attorney General of Iowa

See also
General Turner (disambiguation)